The men's 50 kilometres walk event at the 1951 Pan American Games was held at the Estadio Monumental in Buenos Aires on 28 February. The event would not be contested again at the Games until 1967.

Results

References

Athletics at the 1951 Pan American Games
1951